There are 92 well-preserved churches from the Middle Ages on the Swedish island of Gotland, more than in any other part of Sweden and unusually many compared with other parts of Europe. Benefiting from its location in the middle of the Baltic Sea, the island enjoyed an increase in wealth thanks to expanding trade between Western and Eastern Europe, giving the inhabitants the means to build large and prestigious churches. The preserved churches date from between the early 12th century and the middle of the 14th century.  The first churches were stave churches, but of these only fragments remain. The oldest substantially preserved churches on Gotland are simple Romanesque churches. Church architecture remained conservative on Gotland, and, while Gothic forms eventually replaced Romanesque, it never acquired the structurally light character it did elsewhere in Europe. The churches built during the first half of the 14th century on Gotland are sometimes referred to as "counter-Gothic" in Swedish literature.

The churches were often decorated inside with paintings on walls and vaults and stained-glass windows, as well as decorative sculptures both inside and outside. In the Gothic period particularly, the portals of the churches were adorned with stone sculptures. Workshops specialising in the production of decorated baptismal fonts established themselves on Gotland during the 12th century and supplied the churches with fonts, which in many cases still exist in the churches. Wooden sculptures were also produced from an early time, including rood crosses and sculptures of saints like the Viklau Madonna.

In the middle of the 14th century, Gotland entered a period of decline and turmoil, and suffered a loss of trade from which the island would never recover. No new churches were built on the island after around 1350. In Visby, only Visby Cathedral was maintained, while other churches, of which there were at least twelve, were left to decay. The systematic study of the churches on Gotland began in the 19th century.

Background
The Christianisation of Scandinavia, whereby Norse religion was gradually replaced by Christianity, began in the 9th century. During the 11th century, a church organisation with bishops and dioceses was established, and Norse religion was finally abandoned. Gotland became a part of the Diocese of Linköping, probably during the middle of the 12th century, and would remain so until the creation of the Diocese of Visby in 1572. Thanks to its location within the Baltic Sea, Gotland benefited economically from an increase in trade between Eastern and Western Europe during the Middle Ages giving the inhabitants the financial means to construct large, prestigious churches.

The first churches on Gotland were wooden stave churches, but they were used for a relatively short time before stone churches began to replace them. Traces of around ten stave churches have been found on Gotland. The most well-preserved remains are those of Hemse stave church, whose timber had been re-used as floor boards in a later stone church. Wooden churches were built over a time span of a bit less than 100 years,  1120–1200. These first churches were probably not parish churches in the modern sense, but erected on private initiative adjacent to rich farmsteads by members of the local elite. (However, Gotland differed from much of Europe in that there was no land-owning aristocracy of the island.) Later, church building became a communal undertaking, where several peasants joined forces to finance a church. In the Hanseatic town of Visby the situation differed from that in the countryside. There, many of the churches were constructed by religious orders, confraternities or foreign merchants; present-day Visby Cathedral originally served the German traders of the city. More churches were eventually built in Visby than in any other city in medieval Sweden, and there were at least 12 churches within the city wall. Only Visby Cathedral remains, the rest having been preserved as ruins only.

Architecture

The first stone churches on Gotland were built in the first half of the 12th century. They were simple Romanesque churches. They were constructed without a socle or base, and had undecorated, narrow, round-arched portals. Sometimes they were decorated with friezes of reliefs depicting religious or possibly mythological subjects; some of these have been preserved by being re-used and incorporated in later, Gothic structures. These earliest churches display stylistic influences from both Western and Eastern Europe, the latter especially evident in the Russo-Byzantine church murals in Garde Church. During the second half of the 12th century, stylistic tendencies shifted decisively towards Western Europe. The construction site of Lund Cathedral in Scania spread influences from present-day Germany. The establishment of the Cistercian Roma Abbey on Gotland in 1164 would have a lasting influence on church architecture on Gotland, which came to incorporate several elements from Cistercian architecture. These include both certain notable details, such as chancels lacking apses, with straight walls facing east containing three lancet windows, but also a general tendency towards a relatively austere architecture. Inside, these churches were probably all decorated with murals, but very few of these have been preserved. A greater number of Romanesque furnishings have been preserved. Workshops specialising in making sculpted baptismal fonts were established on Gotland during the 12th century and not only supplied the churches on Gotland with decorated fonts, but also exported fonts to the entire Baltic region. Several of these workshops have been given notnames by later art historians, such as Majestatis and Byzantios, while other labels, such as Sigraf and Hegvald, derive from inscriptions found on the fonts. A number of wooden sculptures have also been preserved from this time, including the Viklau Madonna, one of the most well-preserved 12th-century wooden sculptures in Europe, and a number of rood crosses from the same workshop.

A boom in church building began on Gotland around 1225. New churches were erected and older churches were rebuilt. During this period, a local variant of Gothic architecture would replace the earlier Romanesque style. The churches became considerably larger, with vaults supported by pillars and divided into several bays. Apses were no longer built. Another peculiarity is that the north side of the churches almost always lacked windows; whether for practical, religious or superstitious reasons is not known. Stylistically, a conservative Early Gothic style, still strongly reminiscent of Romanesque through its heavy volumes and often round arches, would prevail until the end of the 13th century. Influences came from Westphalia, conveyed via Visby, an indication of the trade connections of the time. At the end of the 13th and early 14th century the style shifted towards what is often referred to as High Gothic In contrast to earlier churches, these churches have decidedly Gothic forms such as larger, pointed arch windows and more slender pillars supporting higher vaults. Several of them are decorated with murals. Also more stained glass windows are preserved from this period, and the churches of Gotland contain the largest amount of medieval stained glass in Sweden, with Lye Church containing the largest intact set in the Nordic countries. From  1320 until around 1360, the last great building period took place on Gotland. Stylistically, there is a change towards a heavier architecture, which in Swedish literature sometimes is referred to as "counter-Gothic". While purely Gothic in details such as windows and portals, the architecture does not strive for lighter volumes and soaring heights, with walls dissolved into large expanses of windows supported by buttresses and pilasters. Structurally, the churches instead again tended towards more closed-in, darker spaces and heavier volumes. During the entire Gothic period, the main portals of the churches were often richly decorated. During the Early and High Gothic period, this decoration often consisted of stylised floral decoration. During the 14th century, the decoration became more profuse and also narrative, often depicting religious or mythological scenes on the capitals of the portal columns. These sculptures were originally painted in vivid colours. The church towers erected during this period are also considerably taller than before. A single workshop, today known by its notname as  after some of the sculptures that have features vaguely reminiscent of the art of ancient Egypt, appears to have been employed in a large number of churches.

In the middle of the 14th century, Gotland entered a period of economic decline and a loss in trade from which it would never recover. At the same time, the Black Death struck Gotland in 1350. The invasion of Gotland by Valdemar IV of Denmark and the Battle of Visby (1361) led to further disruptions. All these factors appear to have contributed to decreasing building activity, even though it remains difficult to pinpoint exact causes and effects in the building histories of individual churches. Many churches were left unfinished, and the abrupt halt in construction is often still visible in the buildings. Archaeologist Anders Andrén writes that it is "as if the stone masons had left the construction site for the day and never returned". Many churches on Gotland thus have a peculiar form, where often the chancel is disproportionally large in comparison with the rest of the church. In such cases, a planned reconstruction of the entire church had started during the 14th century with the chancel, but was brought to a halt before the whole reconstruction scheme could be finished.

After the second half of the 14th century, no new churches were built on Gotland. Inside, some churches did receive further embellishment in the form of new altarpieces or murals into the 15th and 16th centuries.  Following the Reformation, changes in the liturgy led to the installation of new types of fittings, including pulpits and different kinds of altarpieces. Many altarpieces were made locally in Burgsvik during the 17th century and today often give a Baroque touch to the medieval churches. While the churches on Gotland have attracted interest since at least the 17th century, a more scientific approach to them started only during the 19th century. Art historian Johnny Roosval presented a first systematic study in Die Kirchen Gotlands ("The churches of Gotland"), published in German in 1911. Roosval dated the different churches on Gotland mainly on stylistic grounds. The timeline he established has subsequently been revised in individual cases, both by Roosval and by others. Overall, Roosval's assumptions about the age of the churches on Gotland are still widely accepted. Archaeological examinations in connection with renovations of the churches in particular during the 20th century served to further tweak the dates in individual cases but also to confirm the overall timeline. In a few cases where contemporary scientific methods have been used to examine the churches, radiocarbon dating and to a lesser extent dendrochronology have also lent some support to the established timeline.

The churches

See also
 List of churches and chapels on Gotland

References

Works cited

Further reading

External links

Sweden religion-related lists
Gotland
Architecture lists
Gotland,Mediaeval
Churches on Gotland
Gotland